This is the discography of English post-punk band the Durutti Column.

Albums

Studio albums

Live albums

Compilation albums

Box sets

Video albums

Other albums

EPs

Singles

Notes

References

Discographies of British artists
Rock music group discographies